The Liberty School No. 4, Friendship Building is a school building built in 1899 in the Friendship neighborhood of Pittsburgh, Pennsylvania. It now houses Pittsburgh Montessori School PreK-5, a public Montessori Magnet School that is part of the Pittsburgh Public School District. It was listed on the National Register of Historic Places in 1986.

References

Beaux-Arts architecture in Pennsylvania
School buildings completed in 1899
Schools in Pittsburgh
School buildings on the National Register of Historic Places in Pennsylvania
City of Pittsburgh historic designations
Pittsburgh History & Landmarks Foundation Historic Landmarks
National Register of Historic Places in Pittsburgh
1899 establishments in Pennsylvania